Mongpawn (also spelt Möngpawn), also known as Maingpun, was a Shan state in what is today Burma. The state was part of the Eastern Division of the Southern Shan States and was located south of Laihka State in the valley of the Nam Pawn river.

History
According to tradition a predecessor state in the area was named Rajjavadi. Möngpawn state was founded in 1816 under the overlordship of Mongnai State.
Historically Mongpawn played an important part before the British annexation of Upper Burma, at the time of the Burmese resistance movement 1885–95. The ruler of Mongpawn was an active supporter of the Limbin Prince, Kanaung Mintha, also known as Prince Limbin, was a son of King Tharrawaddy Min.

Traditionally about two thirds of the population in the state belonged to the Shan and about one third to the Pa'O people groups, the former living in the valley and the latter on the hilly areas.

Rulers
The rulers of Mongpawn bore the title of Myoza and from 1887, Saopha.

Myozas 
1816–1860: Hkun Lek (d. 1860)
1860–1882: Hkun Ti (1847–1928)

Saophas
1882–1928: Hkun Ti (s.a.)
1928 – 19 Jul 1947: Sao Sam Htun (b. 1907–d. 1947)
20 July 1947 – 1958: Sao Hso Hom (b. 1936)

References

External links

Shan States